The 2021 Bulgarian Basketball Cup was the 67th edition of the annual cup tournament in Bulgaria.It is managed by the Bulgarian Basketball Federation and was held in Panagyurishte, Arena Asarel.   The competition started at 11th of March 2021, with the quarterfinals and ended with the Final on March 15, 2021. Rilski Sportist won their third cup. Nico Carvacho was named MVP.

Qualified teams
The first eight teams qualified after the first stage of the 2020-21 NBL regular season.

Draw
The 2021 Bulgarian Basketball Cup was drawn on 22 February 2021 at approximately 12:00. The seeded teams were paired in the quarterfinals with the non-seeded teams. There were not any restrictions for the draw of the semifinals.

Bracket

Quarterfinals

Semifinals

Finals

References

Bulgarian Basketball Cup
Cup